Bunić is a village in Lika, Croatia, located in the Udbina municipality, between Korenica and Lički Osik. The population is 133 (census 2011).

History
The 1712–14 census of Lika and Krbava registered 2,058 inhabitants, of whom 2,051 were Vlachs, and 7 were "Turks".

In 1743 Ernst Laudon an Austrian generalisimo built a church to commemorate his children who died and were buried in Bunić and in 1746 he planted an oak forest now called by his name.

The place was heavily damaged in the Second World War by the Croatian Ustashe who expelled and erased most Serbs, and greatly damaged the church.

Notable natives and residents
 Dragan Aleksić, artist
 Mirjana Rakić, journalist
 Rade Šerbedžija, actor

References

Populated places in Lika-Senj County